He Qun (7 December 1955 – 31 December 2016) was a Chinese filmmaker. A graduate of the 1982 class of the Beijing Film Academy, he was an inaugural member of China's "Fifth Generation" movement.

Early life
He was born in 1955 in Nanjing, Jiangsu. Like many of his generation, his early life was thrown into turmoil by the Cultural Revolution. His father, an artist, was denounced as a rightist, and He was sent to the outskirts of Beijing where he did manual labor as a welder for six years. In 1978, He was admitted to the Beijing Film Academy in its art department, and was assigned to the Guangxi Film Studio when he graduated in 1982.

Career
He's early career was as an art director, where he worked on many important films of the early Fifth Generation movement, including The Big Parade (1986, directed by Chen Kaige) and Widow Village (1988, directed by Wang Jin).

In 1988, he began his career in direction with the war film Mutiny. Since then, he has directed films of several genres, including gangster films (Westbound Convict Train, 1989), comedies (Once Conned, 1992) and mysteries (The Vanished Woman (1992).  In 1993, He found critical success with his rural drama Country Teachers, which won the Golden Rooster Award for best picture.

Selected filmography

As art director

As director

As actor

References

External links

He Qun at the Chinese Movie Database

1956 births
2016 deaths
Film directors from Jiangsu
Art directors
Beijing Film Academy alumni
Chinese film directors